Peter Williston Shor (born August 14, 1959) is an American professor of applied mathematics at MIT. He is known for his work on quantum computation, in particular for devising Shor's algorithm, a quantum algorithm for factoring exponentially faster than the best currently-known algorithm running on a classical computer.

Early life and education 
Shor was born in New York City to Joan Bopp Shor and S. W. Williston Shor, of Jewish descent. He grew up in Washington, D.C. and Mill Valley, California. While attending Tamalpais High School, he placed third in the 1977 USA Mathematical Olympiad. After graduation that year, he won a silver medal at the International Math Olympiad in Yugoslavia (the U.S. team achieved the most points per country that year). He received his B.S. in Mathematics in 1981 for undergraduate work at Caltech, and was a Putnam Fellow in 1978. He earned his PhD in Applied Mathematics from MIT in 1985. His doctoral advisor was F. Thomson Leighton, and his thesis was on probabilistic analysis of bin-packing algorithms.

Career 
After being awarded his PhD by MIT, he spent one year as a postdoctoral researcher at the University of California, Berkeley, and then accepted a position at Bell Labs in New Providence, New Jersey. It was there he developed Shor's algorithm. This development was inspired by Simon's problem, where he first solved the discrete log problem (which relates point-finding on a hypercube to a torus,) and,"Later that week, I was able to solve the factoring problem as well. There’s a strange relation between discrete log and factoring."Due to their similarity as HSP problems, Shor discovered a related factoring problem (Shor's algorithm) that same week for which he was awarded the Nevanlinna Prize at the 23rd International Congress of Mathematicians in 1998 and the Gödel Prize in 1999. In 1999 he was awarded a MacArthur Fellowship. In 2017 he received the Dirac Medal of the ICTP and for 2019 the BBVA Foundation Frontiers of Knowledge Award in Basic Sciences.

Shor began his MIT position in 2003. Currently, he is the Henry Adams Morss and Henry Adams Morss, Jr. Professor of Applied Mathematics in the Department of Mathematics at MIT. He also is affiliated with CSAIL and the MIT Center for Theoretical Physics (CTP).

He received a Distinguished Alumni Award from Caltech in 2007.

On October 1, 2011, he was inducted into the American Academy of Arts and Sciences. He was elected as an ACM Fellow in 2019 "for contributions to quantum-computing, information theory, and randomized algorithms". He was elected as a member of the National Academy of Sciences in 2002. In 2020, he was elected a member of the National Academy of Engineering for pioneering contributions to quantum computation.

In an interview published in Nature on October 30, 2020, Shor said that he considers post-quantum cryptography to be a solution to the quantum threat, although a lot of engineering effort is required to switch from vulnerable algorithms.

Along with three others, Shor was awarded the 2023 Breakthrough Prize in Fundamental Physics for "foundational work in the field of quantum information."

See also
Entanglement-assisted classical capacity
Keller's conjecture
Stabilizer code
Quantum capacity

Notes

External links 
.
Peter Shor's Home Page at MIT.
Quantum Computing Expert Peter Shor Receives Carnegie Mellon's 1998 Dickson Prize in Science.

The story of Shor's algorithm — Youtube.

Lectures and panels
Video of "Harnessing Quantum Physics", Peter Shor's panel discussion with Ignacio Cirac, Michele Mosca, Avi Wigderson, Daniel Gottesman and Dorit Aharonov, at the Quantum to Cosmos festival

American computer scientists
Theoretical computer scientists
1959 births
Living people
MacArthur Fellows
Fellows of the Association for Computing Machinery
Fellows of the American Mathematical Society
Members of the United States National Academy of Sciences
Gödel Prize laureates
Nevanlinna Prize laureates
Putnam Fellows
Scientists from California
California Institute of Technology alumni
Massachusetts Institute of Technology School of Science alumni
Tamalpais High School alumni
International Mathematical Olympiad participants
20th-century American engineers
21st-century American engineers
20th-century American mathematicians
21st-century American mathematicians
20th-century American scientists
21st-century American scientists
Quantum information scientists
MIT Center for Theoretical Physics faculty